Har Bilas Sarda (1867–1955) was an Indian academic, judge and politician. He is best known for having introduced the Child Marriage Restraint Act (1929).

Early life 

Har Bilas Sarda was born on 3 June 1867 in Ajmer, in a Maheshwari family. His father Sriyut Har Narayan Sarda (Maheshwari) was a Vedantist, who worked as a librarian at the Government College, Ajmer. He had a sister who died in September 1892.

Sarda passed his matriculation exam in 1883. Subsequently, he studied at the Agra College (then affiliated to Calcutta University), and obtained a Bachelor of Arts (BA) degree in 1888. He passed with Honours in English, and also studied philosophy and Persian. He started his career as a teacher in the Government College, Ajmer, in 1889. He wanted to pursue further studies at the Oxford University, but abandoned his plans because of his father's poor health. His father died in April 1892; a few months later, his sister and mother also died.

Sarda travelled extensively in British India, from Shimla in north to Rameswaram in south, and from Bannu in west to Calcutta in east. In 1888, Sarda visited the Indian National Congress session at Allahabad. He attended several more meetings of the Congress, including those at Nagpur, Bombay, Benares, Calcutta and Lahore.

Judicial service 

In 1892, Sarda started working at the Judicial Department of the Ajmer-Merwara province. In 1894, he became the Municipal Commissioner of Ajmer, and worked on revising the Ajmer Regulation Book, the province's compendium of laws and regulations. Later, he was transferred to the Foreign Department, where he was appointed Guardian to the ruler of the Jaisalmer State. He returned to the Judicial Department of Ajmer-Merwara in 1902. There, over the years, he served in various roles, including the Additional Extra Assistant Commissioner, the Sub-judge First Class, and the Judge of Small Cause Court. He also served as the Honorary Secretary of the Ajmer-Merwara Publicity Board during World War I. In 1923, he was made the Additional District and Sessions Judge. He retired from the government service in December 1923.

In 1925, he was appointed Senior Judge of the Chief Court, Jodhpur.

Political career 

Sarda was elected a Member of the Central Legislative Assembly in January 1924, when Ajmer-Merwara was given a seat in the Assembly for the first time. He was re-elected to the Assembly in 1926 and 1930. A member of the now-defunct Nationalist Party, he was elected its Deputy Leader in 1932. The same year, he was elected one of the Assembly's chairpersons.

He served in several committees, including:

 Petitions Committee
 Primary Education Committee
 Retrenchment Committee
 General Purposes Sub-Committee
 Standing Finance Committee
 House Committee (President)
 B. B. &. C. I. Railway Advisory Committee

As a legislator, he introduced several bills passed in the Assembly:

 Child Marriage Restraint Act (passed in September 1929; came into effect in 1930)
 Ajmer-Merwara Court Fee Amendment Act (passed)
 Ajmer- Merwara Juvenile Smoking Bill (thrown out by the Council of State)
 A bill to give the Hindu widows a right in family property (thrown out due to Government opposition)

Sarda also played a role in the municipal administration. He was appointed a member of the Ajmer Municipal Administration Enquiry Committee in 1933, and was elected Senior Vice-Chairman of the New Municipal Committee in 1934.

Besides legislative politics, he also participated in several social organizations. In 1925, he was elected President of the All India Vaishya Conference  in Bareilly. In 1930, he was elected President of the Indian National Social Conference in Lahore.

Arya Samaj 

Har Bilas Sarda was a follower of the Hindu reformer Dayanand Saraswati since childhood, and a member of the Arya Samaj. In 1888, he was appointed President of the Ajmer chapter of the Samaj, and also President of the Pratinidhi Sabha (representative committee of the Arya Samajis) of Rajputana. In 1890, he was appointed a member of the Paropkarini Sabha, a body of 23 members appointed by Dayanand Saraswati by his will to carry on his works after him. In 1894, he replaced Mohanlal Pandya as the Joint Secretary of the Paropkarini Sabha, when the organization's office moved from Udaipur to Ajmer. After Pandya's retirement, Sarda became the sole Secretary of the organization.

Sarda played an important role in the establishment of a DAV School in Ajmer, and later became the President of DAV Committee of Ajmer. He also played an important role in organizing Dayanand's Birth Centenary functions in Mathura, in 1925. He was General Secretary of the group that organized a function for Semi-Centenary of Dayanand in Ajmer, in 1933.

Author 

Sarda authored the following books and monographs:

 Hindu Superiority
 Ajmer: Historical and Descriptive
 Maharana Kumbha
 Maharana Sanga
 Maharaja Hammir of Ranthambhor

He wrote research papers for The Indian Antiquary and Journal of the Royal Asiatic Society.

Awards and honours 

Sarda was awarded following titles by the British Indian government:

 Rai Sahib, for his services in garnering support for the British government during the World War I
 Dewan Bahadur (1931), for his work in the Legislative Assembly

References

External links 

 Hindu superiority by Har Bilas Sarda
 Maharana Sanga by Har Bilas Sarda

1867 births
1955 deaths
People from Ajmer
Arya Samajis
Members of the Central Legislative Assembly of India
20th-century Indian judges
20th-century Indian biographers
University of Calcutta alumni